Theodore Voigtlander (August 3, 1913 - December 7, 1988) was an American cinematographer. He won four Primetime Emmy Awards and was nominated for thirteen more in the category Outstanding Cinematography for his work on the television programs Ben Casey, The Wild, Wild West, Bonanza, Little House on the Prairie, Highway to Heaven and also the television films It's Good to Be Alive, The Loneliest Runner, The Diary of Anne Frank and The Bad Seed. Voigtlander died in December 1988 of cancer in Los Angeles, California, at the age of 75.

References

External links 

1913 births
1988 deaths
People from Kellogg, Idaho
American cinematographers
Deaths from cancer in California
Primetime Emmy Award winners